Léon Victor Auguste Bourgeois (21 May 185129 September 1925) was a French statesman. His ideas influenced the Radical Party regarding a wide range of issues. He promoted progressive taxation such as progressive income taxes and social insurance schemes, along with economic equality, expanded educational opportunities, and cooperative solidarism. In foreign policy, he called for a strong League of Nations, and the maintenance of peace through compulsory arbitration, controlled disarmament, economic sanctions, and perhaps an international military force.

Biography
Bourgeois was born in Paris in to a modest Republican family of a watchmaker of Burgundian descent, and was trained in law.  After holding a subordinate office (1876) in the department of public works, he became successively prefect of the Tarn (1882) and the Haute-Garonne (1885), and then returned to Paris to enter the Ministry of the Interior. He became Prefect of Police in November 1887 at the critical moment of Jules Grévy's resignation from the presidency. In the following year, he entered the Chamber, being elected deputy for the Marne, in opposition to George Boulanger, and joined the Radical Left. He was undersecretary for Home Affairs in Charles Floquet's ministry of 1888 and resigned with it in 1889, being then returned to the chamber for Reims. In Pierre Tirard's ministry, which succeeded, he was Minister of the Interior, and subsequently, on 18 March 1890, Minister of Public Instruction in the cabinet of Charles Louis de Saulces de Freycinet, a post for which he had qualified himself by the attention he had given to educational matters. In this capacity, he was responsible for some important reforms in secondary education in 1890. 

He retained his office in Émile Loubet's cabinet in 1892, and was Minister of Justice under Alexandre Ribot at the end of that year, when the Panama scandals were making the office one of peculiar difficulty. He energetically pressed the Panama prosecution, so much so that he was accused of having put wrongful pressure on the wife of one of the defendants in order to procure evidence. To meet the charge, he resigned in March 1893 but again took office and retired only with the rest of the Freycinet ministry.

In November 1895, he formed his own cabinet, distinctively radical, which fell as the result of a constitutional crisis arising from the persistent refusal of the Senate to vote supply. He was an eminent Freemason and eight of his cabinet members were Freemasons.

The Bourgeois ministry seemed to think that popular opinion would enable them to override what they regarded as an unconstitutional action on the part of the upper house. However, the public was indifferent, and the Senate triumphed. The blow damaged Bourgeois's career as an homme de gouvernement. As Minister of Public Instruction in the Brisson cabinet of 1898, he organized courses for adults in primary education. After the short ministry, he represented his country with dignity and effect at the Hague Peace Convention, and in 1903 was nominated a member of the permanent court of arbitration.

He held somewhat aloof from the political struggles of the Waldeck-Rousseau and Combes ministries, travelling considerably in foreign countries. In 1902 and 1903, he was elected president of the Chamber. In 1905, he replaced the duc d'Audiffret-Pasquier as senator for the department of Marne, and in May 1906, he became Minister of Foreign Affairs in the Sarrien cabinet. He was responsible for the direction of French diplomacy in the conference at Algeciras. He was delegate to both Hague Conferences held in 1899 and 1907. Bourgeois also became delegate to Paris Peace Conference and strongly supported the Japanese Racial Equality Proposal as "an indisputable principle of justice".

Following World War I, he became President of the Council of the League of Nations and won the Nobel Peace Prize for his work in 1920.

A social republican, Bourgeois sought a middle ground between socialism and capitalism which he termed "solidarism". He believed that the rich had a social debt to the poor which they should pay by the income tax, thus providing the state with the necessary revenue to finance social measures for those living in poverty. However, the Senate opposed his proposal, and opposition grew until his resignation as prime minister.

Bourgeois's Ministry, 1 November 1895 – 29 April 1896
Léon Bourgeois – President of the Council and Minister of the Interior
Marcellin Berthelot – Minister of Foreign Affairs
Godefroy Cavaignac – Minister of War
Paul Doumer – Minister of Finance
Louis Ricard – Minister of Justice
Édouard Locroy – Minister of Marine
Émile Combes – Minister of Public Instruction, Fine Arts, and Worship
Albert Viger – Minister of Agriculture
Pierre-Paul Guieysse – Minister of Colonies
Edmond Guyot-Dessaigne – Minister of Public Works
Gustave Mesureur – Minister of Commerce, Industry, Posts, and Telegraphs

Changes
28 March 1896 – Bourgeois succeeds Berthelot as Minister of Foreign Affairs. Ferdinand Sarrien succeeds Bourgeois as Minister of the Interior.

Support to the French National Museum of Natural History 
Bourgeois is one of the founders of the Friends of the Natural History Museum Paris society. He was the very first president in office from 1907 to 1922.

References

 France since 1870: Culture, Politics and Society by Charles Sowerine.

External links

  including the communication with the Nobel Committee, December, 1922 The Reasons for the League of Nations
 About Leon Victor Auguste Bourgeois on nobel-winners.com
 
 

1851 births
1925 deaths
Politicians from Paris
Radical Party (France) politicians
Prime Ministers of France
French Foreign Ministers
French Ministers of Justice
French interior ministers
Presidents of the Chamber of Deputies (France)
Members of the 4th Chamber of Deputies of the French Third Republic
Members of the 5th Chamber of Deputies of the French Third Republic
Members of the 6th Chamber of Deputies of the French Third Republic
Members of the 7th Chamber of Deputies of the French Third Republic
Members of the 8th Chamber of Deputies of the French Third Republic
French Senators of the Third Republic
Senators of Marne (department)
Presidents of the Senate (France)
Prefects of Haute-Garonne
Prefects of Tarn (department)
Prefects of police of Paris
Delegates to the Hague Peace Conferences
Members of the Permanent Court of Arbitration
Presidents of the Assembly of the League of Nations
French Freemasons
Nobel Peace Prize laureates
French Nobel laureates
Officiers of the Légion d'honneur
French judges of international courts and tribunals